Clyde Aubra Southwick (November 3, 1886 – October 14, 1961) was a catcher in Major League Baseball. He played for the St. Louis Browns in 1911. He was well known throughout the league by his nickname, "Cheese", and he is even referred to as "Cheese Southwick" on some vintage baseball cards.

References

External links

1886 births
1961 deaths
Major League Baseball catchers
St. Louis Browns players
Hannibal Cannibals players
Peoria Distillers players
Baseball players from Iowa
Iowa State Cyclones baseball players